The Mellon Institute of Industrial Research is a former research institute in Pittsburgh, Pennsylvania, United States, which is now part of Carnegie Mellon University. It was founded in 1913 by Andrew Mellon and Richard B. Mellon as part of the University of Pittsburgh, and was originally located in Allen Hall. After becoming an independent research center and moving to a new building on Fifth Avenue, the Mellon Institute subsequently merged with the Carnegie Institute of Technology in 1967 to form Carnegie Mellon University. While it ceased to exist as a distinct institution, the landmark building bearing its name remains located at the corner of Fifth Avenue and Bellefield Avenue in Oakland, the city's university district. It is sited adjacent to The Carnegie Mellon Software Engineering Institute (SEI) and the University of Pittsburgh's Bellefield Hall and is across Bellefield Avenue from two other local landmarks: the University of Pittsburgh's Heinz Memorial Chapel and the Cathedral of Learning.

Designed by architect Benno Janssen (1874–1964), the Mellon Institute building is noted for its neo-classical architecture and elegant construction, with its signature monolithic limestone columns (the largest monolithic columns in the world). Andrew Mellon, who served as United States Secretary of the Treasury, specified to Janssen a building with a monumental ionic colonnade similar to the Treasury Building in Washington, D.C. The proportions of the Mellon Institute's street facades are nearly those of the long lateral facade of the Parthenon on the Acropolis in Athens, Greece. The Mellon Institute building was completed and dedicated posthumously to the Mellon brothers in May 1937.

The Mellon Institute building currently houses the Office of the Dean for Carnegie Mellon University's Mellon College of Science, as well as the administrative offices and research laboratories for the Department of Biological Sciences and Department of Chemistry. From 1986 until 2006, it also housed the Pittsburgh Supercomputing Center.

History

The Mellon Institute of Industrial Research was first established as the Department of Industrial Research at the University of Pittsburgh. It conducted research for firms on a contractual basis; a company would contract the institute to solve a specific problem, and the institute would then hire an appropriate scientist to do the research. The results of the research then became the property of the contracting company.

In 1928, the institute was incorporated as a nonprofit, independent research center and planning for a new Mellon Institute building began that same year. When completed in 1937, the institute moved into its new building which sat directly across from the newly completed Cathedral of Learning, and handed its original facility, now known as Allen Hall, back to the University of Pittsburgh. The original design called for two more pillars than architect Janssen decided on. The two extra pillars were buried in the large lawn beside the Cathedral of Learning. The pillars are set to be unburied in 2014 as a new pipe system is installed in the basement of the Cathedral.

In 1967, declining use of independent research institutes for the outsourcing of corporate industrial research led Mellon Institute to merge with the Carnegie Institute of Technology to form Carnegie Mellon University. The "Carnegie Institute of Technology" name was retained to refer to the engineering portion of Carnegie Mellon's "College of Engineering and Science".

In 2013, the American Chemical Society recognized the Mellon Institute as a National Historic Chemical Landmark for its contributions to industrial research and training from its inception in 1913 until its merger with the Carnegie Institute of Technology. Researchers at the Mellon Institute had contributed more than 4,700 papers, 1,600 patents, and other research products, including George O. Curme, Jr.'s discovery of a method for producing acetylene from petroleum that resulted in the production of ethylene and research in organosilicones and the resulting establishment of the Dow Corning Corporation.

For decades, the columns of the Mellon Institute building have served as a popular background for photographers shooting Pittsburgh wedding parties.

Fictional portrayals
 Exterior shots of the Mellon Institute were used to portray the fictitious Tanner Museum in the series premiere of the short-lived 2006 CBS television drama Smith starring Ray Liotta and Amy Smart.  
 The 1990 film Citizen Cohn starring James Woods used the exterior to depict 1960s-era Washington, D.C.
 The 1992 film Hoffa starring Danny DeVito and Jack Nicholson filmed on location to depict Federal Courthouses and other government buildings.
 The 1992 film Lorenzo's Oil shows an interior shot of a lecture hall in Mellon Institute.
 The 2002 film The Mothman Prophecies starring Richard Gere depicted the building as a fictional institute for paranormal studies in Chicago. 
 The 2012 film The Dark Knight Rises starring Christian Bale filmed on location to depict "Gotham City Hall".

References

External links

 Mellon College of Science
 Mellon Institute architecture
 Documentary on the construction of the Mellon Institute
 1987 news feature on Institute's history

Schools and departments of Carnegie Mellon
Buildings and structures in Pittsburgh
Educational institutions established in 1913
University and college buildings completed in 1937
Neoclassical architecture in Pennsylvania
Pittsburgh History & Landmarks Foundation Historic Landmarks
Historic district contributing properties in Pennsylvania
1913 establishments in Pennsylvania
National Register of Historic Places in Pittsburgh